Craspedodiscus may refer to:
 Craspedodiscus (alga), a diatom genus in the family Coscinodiscaceae
 Craspedodiscus (cephalopod), an ammonite genus from the mid Early Cretaceous in the family Olcostephanitidae